Lars Boje Mathiesen (born 21 May 1975) is a Danish politician who from February 2023 to March 2023 was the leader of the Nye Borgerlige political party. He has been a member of the Folketing since June 2019. He was excluded from New Right in March 2023.

Background
Mathiesen was born on 21 May 1975 in Skive, Denmark and is the son of musician Peter Boje Mathiesen and Inge Burmølle Mathiesen.

Political career
Mathiesen started in politics in 2013, where he was elected into Aarhus Municipality's municipal council, as a member of Liberal Alliance. He left the party in 2016 and, after a short unaffiliated period, joined Nye Borgerlige. He chose not to stand again in the next local election, but instead to seek a seat in the Folketing.

In May 2021 he caused a social media backlash when he compared the right to free menstrual products to having "underpants in public toilets" in case someone soils themselves, a comparison that was described as "pure nonsense" by Charlotte Wilkens chief physician at the Department of Gynecology and Obstetrics at Hvidovre Hospital.

References

External links
 

Living people
1975 births
Danish municipal councillors
People from Skive Municipality
The New Right (Denmark) politicians
Members of the Folketing 2019–2022
Members of the Folketing 2022–2026